Live at the Village Vanguard is a live album by trumpeter Red Rodney with multi-instrumentalist Ira Sullivan which was recorded at the Village Vanguard and released on the Muse label in 1980.

Reception

The AllMusic review by Scott Yanow stated "Rodney was inspired in the setting, which featured recent originals rather than bop standards ... Stimulating music". On All About Jazz, Jim Santella noted "Red Rodney’s 1980 sessions at The Village Vanguard marks the beginning of his comeback and finds the leader’s trumpet work in fine form. Two experienced horn players and a young rhythm section made for a strong program with hard bop drama and pure musical ballad sentiment ... After a long career with several disturbing setbacks, it’s nice to remember that Red Rodney succeeded in the end by passing the torch on triumphantly to the next generation".

Track listing
 "Lodgellian Mode" (Jack Walrath) – 8:54
 "A Time for Love"  (Johnny Mandel, Paul Francis Webster) – 5:46
 "Mr. Oliver" (Jeff Meyer) – 8:40
 "What Can We Do" (Simon Salz) – 9:50
 "Come Home to Red" (Walrath) – 5:12
 "Blues in the Guts" (Walrath) – 6:10

Personnel
Red Rodney – trumpet, flugelhorn
Ira Sullivan - flute, soprano saxophone, tenor saxophone, flugelhorn
Garry Dial – piano
Paul Berner – bass
Tom Whaley – drums

References

Muse Records live albums
Red Rodney live albums
Ira Sullivan live albums
1980 live albums
Albums produced by Bob Porter (record producer)
Albums recorded at the Village Vanguard